Predenca is a settlement in the Municipality of Šmarje pri Jelšah in eastern Slovenia. It stands on a hill south of Šmarje. The area is part of the historical Styria region. The municipality is now included in the Savinja Statistical Region.

Landmarks

Church
The local church is one of the local landmarks. It is dedicated to Saint Roch and the path leading up the hill from Šmarje pri Jelšah is lined with fourteen chapels representing Calvary and the Stations of the Cross. The church dates to the mid-17th century and the chapels were built between 1743 and 1753.

References

External links
Predenca at Geopedia

Populated places in the Municipality of Šmarje pri Jelšah